Seminole Manor is a census-designated place (CDP) in Palm Beach County, Florida, United States. The population was 2,562 at the 2020 census. The neighborhood was developed in the late 1950s, with the majority of houses built in 1958 and 1959.

Geography
Seminole Manor is located at  (26.584614, -80.099930).

According to the United States Census Bureau, the CDP has a total area of 1.1 km (0.4 mi2), all land.

Demographics

As of the census of 2000, there were 2,546 people, 875 households, and 678 families residing in the CDP.  The population density was 2,397.6/km (6,262.4/mi2).  There were 933 housing units at an average density of 878.6/km (2,294.9/mi2).  The racial makeup of the CDP was 69.36% White (52.9% were Non-Hispanic White,) 17.32% African American, 0.47% Native American, 0.90% Asian, 0.35% Pacific Islander, 8.09% from other races, and 3.50% from two or more races. Hispanic or Latino of any race were 26.28% of the population.

There were 875 households, out of which 37.4% had children under the age of 18 living with them, 48.0% were married couples living together, 20.7% had a female householder with no husband present, and 22.5% were non-families. 17.1% of all households were made up of individuals, and 6.5% had someone living alone who was 65 years of age or older.  The average household size was 2.91 and the average family size was 3.22.

In the CDP, the population was spread out, with 30.2% under the age of 18, 7.3% from 18 to 24, 29.9% from 25 to 44, 21.1% from 45 to 64, and 11.6% who were 65 years of age or older.  The median age was 34 years. For every 100 females, there were 93.2 males.  For every 100 females age 18 and over, there were 89.3 males.

The median income for a household in the CDP was $36,211, and the median income for a family was $36,797. Males had a median income of $29,630 versus $20,647 for females. The per capita income for the CDP was $13,770.  About 11.0% of families and 12.3% of the population were below the poverty line, including 18.8% of those under age 18 and 2.9% of those age 65 or over.

As of 2000, English was the first language for 69.21% of all residents, while Spanish made up 21.01%, and French Creole was the mother tongue for 9.76% of the population.

References

Census-designated places in Palm Beach County, Florida
Census-designated places in Florida